Common Clay is a 1915 play by the American writer Cleves Kinkead. A social drama, it shows the relationship between a servant and a member of the wealthy family which she serves. When she becomes pregnant she finds herself ostracized by them. The play was controversial on its release, but enjoyed a lengthy run on Broadway. It was the outstanding success of Kinkead's career, and he struggled to repeat it with his later works such as Your Woman and Mine (1922).

Adaptations
It was the basis for a 1919 silent film Common Clay starring Fannie Ward. The film was turned into films twice during the 1930s: A 1930 adaptation Common Clay starring Constance Bennett and a 1936 film Private Number starring Loretta Young.

References

Bibliography
 Bordman, Gerald. American Theatre: A Chronicle of Comedy and Drama 1914-1930. Oxford University Press, 1995.
 Brown, Jared & Hayes, Helen. The Fabulous Lunts: A Biography of Alfred Lunt and Lynn Fontanne. Atheneum, 1986.

External links
 Internet Broadway Database - Common Clay

1915 plays
American plays adapted into films